The Irish History Junior Certificate Examination is an achievement test on world history that is offered to students in Ireland.

It is one of a suite of Junior Certificate Examinations the country uses to assess students. It has two difficulty levels, Higher and Ordinary. This subject is not required at a national level. However, many schools make it compulsory. Most students choose to complete the Higher Level exam.

Ordinary level 
The Ordinary Level exam lasts 90 minutes. It includes four questions. The maximum score is 180.

Higher level 
The exam lasts 150 minutes. It includes six  questions. The maximum score is 270.

Questions 1, 2 and 5 are mandatory. Only 10 of the 20 sub-questions in Question 3 are required. Question 4 includes two sections. One sub-question from each section must be answered. In Question 6, only two of four possible sub-questions need to be completed. The four sub-question topics are:
Question A: Unknown until exam
Question B: Social Life
Question C: Political History
Question D: World War I & World War II

Topics  
Topics include:

External links
History-Skoool.ie
Higher Level History-Skoool.ie
Ordinary Level History-Skoool.ie